A deferred-acceptance auction (DAA) is an auction in which the allocation is chosen by repeatedly rejecting the least attractive bids. It is a truthful mechanism with strategic properties that make it particularly suitable to complex auctions such as the radio spectrum reallocation auction.

Example 
Suppose the government wants to sell broadcasting rights in two areas: North and South. Three agents compete on these rights: 
 Alice needs both areas, and values them (together) as $3M.
 Bob needs only the North, and values it as $1M.
 Carl needs only the South, and values it as $1M.
The government wants to maximize the social welfare. In this case, there are two feasible allocations: either give all rights to Alice (welfare=3), or give the North to Bob and the South to Carl (welfare=2). Since the valuations are private information of the agents, the government needs to use a truthful mechanism in order to induce the agents to reveal their true valuations. We compare two types of truthful mechanisms.

Vickrey–Clarke–Groves solution

The Vickrey–Clarke–Groves (VCG) algorithm finds the socially-optimal allocation, which is to give both areas to Alice. Alice should pay a price determined by the externalities it imposes on the other agents. In this case, Alice pays $2M, since without her, the welfare of Bob and Carl would have been $2M. Bob and Carl receive nothing and pay nothing.

Deferred-acceptance auction solution

The deferred-acceptance auction iteratively rejects the lowest-valued agent that can be rejected while keeping an optimal set of active agents. So, Carl is rejected first, then Bob. Alice remains and she is accepted. She pays the threshold value which is $1M.

Both auction types are truthful - no single agent could gain by reporting a different value. However, they differ when agents can form coalitions. Suppose that Bob and Carl together increase their bid to $4M. Now, the VCG auction will accept Bob and Carl, and charge each of them a price of 0 (since each of them alone has no effect on the allocation to Alice)! In contrast, the DAA will reject Alice, then accept Bob and Carl, and charge each of them his threshold price, which is $3M - so they do not gain anything from their misreport (in fact, they lose $2M).

See also
The performance of deferred-acceptance auctions was analyzed by Dütting et al. in 2014. An application of this idea in a double auction setting was outlined by then-Stanford computer science researchers including Tim Roughgarden in 2014 that same year.

Related articles 

Japanese auction
Vickrey–Clarke–Groves (VCG) auction

References

Types of auction